Frederick Richard Edmund Emmett (11 December 1903 – 3 July 1974) was a New Zealand music dealer and colour therapist. He was born in Nelson, New Zealand on 11 December 1903.

References

1903 births
1974 deaths
20th-century New Zealand musicians